Bijasan Mata Temple is one of the temples of the Hindu goddess Durga, situated in Indore District of Madhya Pradesh, India. This temple is built in the year 1760 by Shivaji Rao Holkar. This temple is visited by thousands of devotees during Navaratri.

Festivals 
The main festivals celebrated here are Navaratri. During the nine-day Navaratri festival, fare is also organized here every year.

Connectivity 
The temple is at a distance of 9.8 kilometers from the Indore Railway Station it will take nearly 27 minutes to reach the temple. Devi Ahilya Bai Holkar International Airport is also visible from the hill on which Bijasan Mata Temple is situated. The temple is connected with proper roadways, one can easily reach the by personal 2 - Wheeler or 4 - Wheeler vehicles.

See also 

 Gajanan Maharaj Temple, Indore
Khajrana Ganesh Temple.

References 

Hindu temples in Indore
Durga temples
Indore district